Hydraulics is a topic in engineering dealing with the mechanical properties of liquids.

Hydraulic may also refer to:

Business
 London Hydraulic Power Company, a London, England power company, closed in 1977

Engineering
 Hydraulic circuit, a system comprising an interconnected set of discrete components that transport liquid
 Hydraulic diameter, a commonly used term when handling flow in non-circular tubes and channels
 Hydraulic engineering, a sub-discipline of civil engineering is concerned with the flow and conveyance of fluids, principally water and sewage
 Hydraulic fracturing, a well-stimulation technique in which rock is fractured by a pressurized liquid
 Hydraulic fracturing by country
 Hydraulic intensifier, a hydraulic machine for transforming hydraulic power at low pressure into a reduced volume at higher pressure
 Hydraulic jump, a phenomenon frequently observed in rivers and spillways, when liquid at high velocity discharges into a zone of lower velocity, and a rather abrupt rise occurs in the liquid surface
 Hydraulic mining, a form of mining that uses high-pressure jets of water to dislodge rock material or move sediment
 Hydraulic power, disambiguation page
 Hydraulic power network, a system of interconnected pipes carrying pressurized liquid used to transmit mechanical power from a power source, like a pump, to hydraulic equipment like lifts or motors
 Hydraulic resistance, disambiguation page
 Hydraulic transmission, disambiguation page
 Hydropower, hydraulic energy

Equipment
 Breaker (hydraulic), a powerful percussion hammer fitted to an excavator for demolishing concrete structures or rocks
 Electro-hydraulic systems, used for power steering
 Hydraulic accumulator, a pressure storage reservoir in which a non-compressible hydraulic fluid is held under pressure by an external source
 Hydraulic brake, an arrangement of braking mechanism which uses brake fluid, typically containing ethylene glycol, to transfer pressure from the controlling mechanism to the braking mechanism
 Hydraulic cement, cement distinguished by its reactivity with water, versus carbon dioxide
 Hydraulic cylinder, (also called a linear hydraulic motor) is a mechanical actuator that is used to give a unidirectional force through a unidirectional stroke
 Hydraulic debarker, a machine removing bark from wooden logs by the use of water under pressure
 Hydraulic drive system, a drive or transmission system that uses pressurized hydraulic fluid to power hydraulic machinery
 Hydraulic fill, an embankment or other fill in which the materials are deposited in place by a flowing stream of water
 Hydraulic fluid, the medium by which power is transferred in hydraulic machinery
 Hydraulic head, or piezometric head is a specific measurement of liquid pressure above a geodetic datum
 Hydraulic lift, a type of hydraulic machinery or a form of hydraulic redistribution, a plant root phenomenon
 Hydraulic lime, a general term for varieties of lime (calcium oxide), or slaked lime (calcium hydroxide), used to make lime mortar which set through hydration: thus they are called hydraulic
 Hydraulic machinery, machinery and tools that use liquid fluid power to do simple work. Heavy equipment is a common example
 Hydraulic manifold, a manifold that regulates fluid flow between pumps and actuators and other components in a hydraulic system
 Hydraulic motor, a mechanical actuator that converts hydraulic pressure and flow into torque and angular displacement (rotation)
 Hydraulic press, a device (see machine press) using a hydraulic cylinder to generate a compressive force
 Hydraulic pressure switch, a pressure switch with applications in automobiles
 Hydraulic ram, a cyclic water pump powered by hydropower
 Hydraulic rescue tools, used by emergency rescue personnel to assist vehicle extrication of crash victims, as well as other rescues from small spaces.
 Hydraulic seal, a relatively soft, non-metallic ring, captured in a groove or fixed in a combination of rings, forming a seal assembly, to block or separate fluid in reciprocating motion applications
 Hydraulic structure, a structure submerged or partially submerged in any body of water, which disrupts the natural flow of water
 Hydraulic tappet, a device for maintaining zero valve clearance in an internal combustion engine
 Hydraulic telegraph, either of two different hydraulic-telegraph telecommunication systems

Places
 Hydraulic, Virginia, an unincorporated community in Albemarle County, Virginia
 Hydraulic, a locality in the Cariboo Land District of British Columbia

Politics
 Hydraulic empire, a political structure which maintains power through exclusive control over access to water

Popular culture
 Hydraulic (Transformers), a fictional character, member of the Micromasters

Science
 Hydraulic analogy, the most widely used analogy for "electron fluid" in a metal conductor
 Hydraulic action, erosion that occurs when the motion of water against a rock surface produces mechanical weathering
 Hydraulic conductivity, a property of vascular plants, soils and rocks, that describes the ease with which a fluid (usually water) can move through pore spaces or fractures
 Hydraulic lift, a type of hydraulic machinery or a form of hydraulic redistribution, a plant root phenomenon
 Hydraulic redistribution, a plant root phenomenon
 Hydraulic retention time, a measure of the average length of time that a compound (ex. water) remains in a storage unit (ex. lake, pond, ocean)

Vehicles
 Hydraulic hybrid, a vehicle that uses a pressurized fluid power source, along with a conventional internal combustion engine
 USS Hydraulic (SP-2584), a United States Navy patrol vessel

Biology

 Hydraulic model of aggression, described by Konrad Lorenz in his 1963 book On Aggression